Misrata International Airport  is an international airport serving Misrata, a Mediterranean coastal city in the Misrata District of Libya. It also acts as an air base and training center for the Libyan Air Force.

History
The airport was created in 1939 as a small landing site in the Misrata province of Italian Libya.

On 15 December 2011 the airport celebrated its first regularly scheduled international commercial flights by a non-Libyan airline (Turkish Airlines).

On 14 July 2014, the airport was closed to flights due to clashes at Tripoli International Airport, which Misrata International Airport is dependent on for its operations. Flights resumed on the night of 15 July.

On August 3, 2020, a fire destroyed the airport's passenger terminal.

Military use
The Libyan Air Force operates the Soko G-2 aircraft extensively at Misrata in both a training and counterinsurgency capacity.

The first Libyan warplane to challenge the no-fly zone during the Libyan Civil War was a G-2 from Misrata. It was reported to have been promptly shot down by the French Air Force. A few hours later an armed forces spokesman specified that the plane was destroyed on the runway with an AASM air-to-ground missile just after it had landed.

Airlines and destinations

See also
Transport in Libya
List of airports in Libya

References

External links

Military installations of Libya
Airports in Libya
Misrata
Tripolitania